In a New York Minute is a 1999 studio album by Ian Shaw.

Track listing
"In a New York Minute" (Fran Landesman, Simon Wallace) – 4:12
"Standing in the Dark" (Sikandar Luck) – 5:22
"Wouldn't It Be Loverly" (Alan Jay Lerner, Frederick Loewe) – 4:55
"I Thought About You" (Johnny Mercer, Jimmy Van Heusen) – 4:29
"Furry Sings the Blues" (Joni Mitchell) – 3:46
"Grandma's Hands" (Bill Withers) – 3:45
"Alfie" (Burt Bacharach, Hal David) – 7:54
"All or Nothing at All" (Arthur Altman, Jack Lawrence) – 6:40
"Shake Down the Stars" (Eddie DeLange, Van Heusen) – 3:55
"No One Ever Tells You" (Hub Atwood, Carroll Coates) – 5:47
"Last Night When We Were Young" (Harold Arlen, Yip Harburg) – 7:59
"That's Life" (Kelly Gordon, Dean Kay) – 2:50

Personnel
Ian Shaw - vocals, arranger
Iain Ballamy - saxophone
Joe Beck - guitar
Cedar Walton - piano, arranger
James Pearson
Geoff Gascoyne - arranger
James Pearson
Simon Wallace
Production
Jamie Putnam - art direction, design
Troy Halderson - engineer
Darren Crowdy - executive producer
Will Friedwald - liner notes
Todd A. Gerard - mastering
John Abbott - photography
Jack Frisch

References

1999 albums
Ian Shaw (singer) albums
Milestone Records albums